The word deltate, in its most common senses, is derived from the Greek delta (letter), specifically the capital form (Δ). It may mean:

 In biology, a triangular leaf shape.
 In chemistry, a salt of deltic acid, which has three carbon atoms connected in a triangle.

See also 
 Deltoid (disambiguation)
 River delta
 Deltic (disambiguation)